Dong Phayayen–Khao Yai Forest Complex is a UNESCO World Heritage Site in Thailand. It covers the areas of five protected areas in the Dong Phaya Yen Mountains and Sankamphaeng Range, namely Khao Yai, Thap Lan, Pang Sida and Ta Phraya National Parks, and Dong Yai Wildlife Sanctuary. The property was inscribed on the World Heritage list in 2005.

Still, continued illegal Siamese rosewood logging and ongoing road expansion risking encroachment within the reserve saw the World Heritage Committee warn of a potential downgrading of the complex to the “World Heritage in Danger List”. At its 41st session in July 2017, the Committee commended Thailand for its efforts in ceasing the illegal logging and trade of Siamese rosewood, but noted several infrastructure projects that could negatively impact the site were still being considered. While the site remains on the World Heritage list, the Committee intends to reexamine the state's conservation efforts at its 44th session in 2020.

In March 2017, the world's second known breeding population of Indochinese tigers was confirmed within the reserve.

References

 

World Heritage Sites in Thailand